The Theme of Dalmatia (thema Dalmatias/Delmatias) was a Byzantine theme (a military-civilian province) on the eastern coast of the Adriatic Sea in Southeastern Europe, headquartered at Jadera (later called Zara, today's Zadar).

Origins

Dalmatia first came under Byzantine control in the 530s, when the generals of Emperor Justinian I (r. 527–565) seized it from the Ostrogoths in the Gothic War. The invasions of the Avars and Slavs in the 7th century destroyed the main cities and overran much of the hinterland, with Byzantine control limited to the islands and certain new coastal cities -with local autonomy and called Dalmatian city-states- such as Spalatum (Split) and Ragusium (Dubrovnik), while Jadera (Zadar) became the local episcopal and administrative center, under an archon. These coastal cities were the refuge of the autochthonous Dalmatian neolatins, who created the original eight Dalmatian city-states: (Vecla (now Krk), Crespa (now Cres), Arba (now Rab), Jadera, Tragurium (now Trogir), Spalatum, Ragusium and Cattaro (now Kotor)).

At the turn of the 8th to 9th century, Dalmatia was seized by Charlemagne (r. 768–814), but he returned it to the Byzantines in 812, after the so-called "Pax Nicephori". It is unclear whether the region was under actual rather than nominal Byzantine authority after that; the local Latin cities appear to have been virtually independent. Nevertheless, an archon of Dalmatia is mentioned in the 842/843 Taktikon Uspensky, and a seal of a "strategos of Dalmatia" dated to the first half of the century may indicate the existence of a Dalmatian theme, at least for a short time.

History

The traditional date of the establishment of Dalmatia as a regular theme is placed in the early years of the reign of Emperor Basil I the Macedonian (r. 867–886), following the expeditions of Niketas Oryphas.

Byzantium, the Roman Pope and the Franks vied for the support of the Slavs in Dalmatia; in 878 AD, Zdeslav of Croatia was a noted Byzantine vassal, who deposed and was in turn deposed in a power struggle involving these powers. With the fall of the Carolingian Empire, the Franks ceased to be a major power in the Adriatic, while the Republic of Venice grew in power in Dalmatia, beginning with Doge Pietro Tradonico.

Around 923 AD, Tomislav of Croatia, the Byzantine Emperor and the two church patriarchs were involved a deal that transferred the control of the Byzantine Dalmatian cities to the new Croatian kingdom. This started a series of similar maneuvers and the Croatian–Bulgarian Wars, during which the Byzantine Emperors of the Macedonian dynasty maintained varying degrees of control over the Dalmatian cities. The Church also endured an analogous internal conflict between the rival dioceses of Spalatum and Nin. The Venetian maritime power was obstructed by the Narentines and the Croats until Pietro II Orseolo who successfully intervened in 998 and 1000, and arranged two important royal marriages with both the Croats and the Byzantines. Under Domenico I Contarini, Venice retook Jadera.

Croatia had another brief period of control over the Dalmatian city-states under Peter Krešimir IV, but the invasion of the Normans shifted the balance of power back to the Venetians. Indeed, in 1075 AD the Norman Count Amico invaded Croatia from southern Italy, on behalf of the Dalmatian cities (by invitation to protect them from Croatian domination). Amico besieged Arbe for almost a month (late April to early May). He failed to take the island, but he allegedly did manage to capture the Croatian king himself (whose mother was the daughter of Doge Pietro Orseolo) at an unidentified location. In return for liberation, he was forced to relinquish many cities, including both his Croatian capitals, as well as Zara, Spalatum, and Tragurium. However, over the next two years, the Venetians banished the Normans and secured the Dalmatian cities for themselves.

In the south of the Dalmatia Theme, the city of Ragusa, one of the main Dalmatian city-states but still under Byzantine control, started to grow in importance, and its Church diocese was elevated to an archbishopric in 998 AD.

In the early 11th century, Byzantine control over the eight Dalmatian city-states started to be contested by the Serb principality of Dioclea, whose ruler Jovan Vladimir took control of Bar, near the border with the Theme of Dyrrhachium. His feats were repeated and bested by Stefan Vojislav twenty years later, and in 1034 AD, the Bar diocese was elevated to an archdiocese, but a war with Theophilos Erotikos soon followed. Stefan Vojislav's son Mihailo obtained papal support following the East–West Schism of 1054, further weakening Byzantine influence in Dalmatia.

Except for Ragusium and the southern third of Dalmatia, Byzantine control collapsed in the 1060s. Constantine Bodin pledged his support for Pope Urban II, which confirmed Bar's status as an archdiocese in 1089 AD, and resulted in a temporary demotion of the Ragusan diocese. By the end of the 11th century, the Kingdom of Hungary took the Kingdom of Croatia's place in controlling the northern Dalmatian hinterland. Duklja remained largely under Byzantine control, with a series of internal conflicts weakening its leaders.

Byzantine predominance was restored under Emperor Manuel I Komnenos (r. 1143–1180), but vanished after his death and was replaced by Venetian control. With the rise of Stefan Nemanja, the Nemanjić dynasty took control of the lands in the south of coastal Dalmatia, while nearly all the Dalmatian islands and coastal north-central Dalmatia was under full Venetian control since the 13th century and remained an area of the Venetian Stato da Mar until 1797.

Byzantine governors of Dalmatia were styled as dukes (pl. of Byzantine Greek "δούξ", doux), a title derived from Latin dux. In the 1170s, the duke was Constantine Doukas.

See also
 Dalmatian city-states
 Venetian Dalmatia
 De Administrando Imperio

References

Sources

 
 

 
 
 

Byzantine Dalmatia
Themes of the Byzantine Empire
History of Dalmatia
Medieval Croatia
States and territories established in the 9th century
States and territories disestablished in the 12th century